Bury Me Deep is a 2009 mystery novel written by Megan Abbott and published by Simon & Schuster.

The book is "a cunningly fictionalized" version of a 1931 crime story in which Winnie Ruth Judd was convicted of the murder of two women in Los Angeles. The Denver Post notes, "Much of the narrative sticks closely to the facts of the case, but the author imagines a vastly different ending, just as plausible but certainly more satisfying than the actual one."

Reception 
Bury Me Deep was generally well-received by critics, including a starred review from Kirkus Reviews, who noted, "Abbott takes readers on a wild thrill ride with an utterly believable and strangely sympathetic heroine."

Publishers Weekly called the novel "well-crafted" but warned, "Readers should be prepared for a lot of backstory before the pace picks up and hurtles to a shocking ending."

References 

2009 American novels
English-language novels
American mystery novels